Neocollyris brendelli is a species of ground beetle in the genus Neocollyris in the family Carabidae. It was described by Naviaux in 1994.

References

 http://www.beetle-diversity.com/node/7085

Brendelli, Neocollyris
Beetles described in 1994